McLemore Cove [elevation: ] is a valley in Walker County, in the U.S. state of Georgia. The valley is located between Pigeon Mountain and Lookout Mountain.

McLemore Cove was named for John McLemore, chief of the Cherokee.

References

Landforms of Walker County, Georgia
Valleys of Georgia (U.S. state)